Michael Milne (born 5 February 1999) is an Irish rugby union player who has come through the Leinster Rugby academy and became a member of the Senior Squad on 15 April 2021. He normally plays as a loosehead prop.

Early life
Milne was born and raised in Crinkill, Birr, County Offaly and first began playing rugby aged five or six for Birr RFC. He attended Cistercian College and helped the school to their first ever Leinster Schools Rugby Senior Cup in 2015.

Leinster
Milne made his senior competitive debut for Leinster in their opening fixture of the 2019–20 Pro14 season away to Italian side Benetton on 28 September 2019, which the province won 32–27.

Ireland
Milne was part of the Ireland under-20s squad that won a grand slam during the 2019 Six Nations Under 20s Championship.

Milne was named in the Emerging Ireland squad that travelled to South Africa in September 2022 and featured against both the Pumas and Cheetahs.

On the 7th November 2022 Milne was called up to train with the Ireland squad for the Bank of Ireland Nations Series 

On the 6th February 2023, Milne was called up to train with the Ireland squad for the 2023 Six Nations following the continuing injury to Cian Healy.

Honours

Cistercian College
Leinster Schools Rugby Senior Cup:
Winner (1): 2015

Ireland Under-20s
Six Nations Under 20s Championship:
Winner (1): 2019
Grand Slam:
Winner (1): 2019
 Triple Crown:
 Winner (1): 2019

References

External links
Leinster Academy Profile
Ireland U20 Profile
Pro14 Profile

1999 births
Living people
People educated at Cistercian College, Roscrea
Rugby union players from County Offaly
Irish rugby union players
Leinster Rugby players
Rugby union props